The 1996 NCAA Division II Lacrosse Championship was the 12th annual tournament to determine the national champions of NCAA Division II men's college lacrosse in the United States.

The final, and only match of the tournament, was played at C.W. Post Stadium at C.W. Post College in Brookville, New York. 

Hosts C.W. Post defeated defending champions Adelphi in the championship game, 15–10, to claim the Pioneers' first Division II national title.

Bracket

See also
1996 NCAA Division I Men's Lacrosse Championship
1996 NCAA Division I Women's Lacrosse Championship
1996 NCAA Division III Men's Lacrosse Championship

References

NCAA Division II Men's Lacrosse Championship
NCAA Division II Men's Lacrosse Championship
NCAA Division II Men's Lacrosse